BC Cherno More Ticha Varna is a Bulgarian basketball team based in Varna. The last time Cherno More won the championship was in 1999.

Honours
Bulgarian Championships
Champions (3): 1985, 1998, 1999
Bulgarian Cup 
 Champions (4): 1998,  1999, 2000, 2015

History

The history of basketball in Varna can be divided into five periods. Everything begins back in 1923, when the “Robert College” alumni – Vaharshak Martaian arrives in the city. At this moment chairman of Sports Club “ Ticha” is the mayor of Varna, Gospodin Angelov, who is keen fan of basketball. The first Varna basketball team is formed, as there play Boris Petrov, who is also a football international player.  The greater part of the players take part in the building of the first basketball court in the northern part of the Sea Garden.  Later that court became a playground for the first games between Bulgarian and USA teams.  Our opponents and teachers were seamen from the ships that controlled the harbor after World War I. The first game between teams from different cities in Varna was “Ticha” against Athletic from Sofia (18-14). Later the other clubs that became part of SSC “Cherno more” – “Vladislav” and “Diana”, created their basketball teams. During the period between 1935 and 1944 in Varna, there is no organized basketball. Thanks to Aleksi Aleksiev, who is a referee and member of “Primoretz”, basketball is revived in 1944. In 1948 “TVP” (Ticha-Vladislav-Primoretz) wins the cup of Varna. In 1952 our team has its first official coach – Vladimir Pinzov. This results in first place among the non capitol teams in the first national championship. „Seamen” are also first among non capital teams in the qualifications for the newly formed National Basketball Division. Until 1969 Varna’s basketball “wanders” between first and second division, as it qualifies mostly in the second one. The most important figures from this period are: Asen Varbanov, Metodi Shishkov, Ilia Lyakov, Vladimir Chakarov, Aleksi Aleksiev, Ivan Feschiev, Ivan Andonov, Ivan Jivaderov, Kosyo Popov, Nikolay Jovchev, Vasil Lafazanov and Dimitar Dikov. During the third period the team becomes constant participant in the Bulgarian First division. From 1970, until 1982 „the seamen” begin to enlarge their ambitions to become more than a “provincial team”. In 1975 the club makes its debut in the European Club Competitions – the “Radivoje Korac” cup. In the preliminary round, under the name of “Akademic” – Varna, we eliminate “Karshiaka” from Izmir. In the group we play “Partizan” – Beograd, “Sinudinia” – Bologna and “Bayer tuss 04” – Leverkusen. At that campaign we beat “Partizan” 116-100 in the full “Kongresna” hall.  The most significant trainers from this period are Yanko Bimbalov, Stoyan Kolarov, Kalcho Ganchev and Delcho Popov. Some of the best players for this period are: Hristo Borisov, Plamen Ganchev, Totiu Vitchev, Rumen Spasov, Stefan Karalukanov, Veselin Todorov, Ivan Zetov, Vlado Evtimov, Stancho Kostov and many more. The period 1982–2000 is “golden” for Varna’s basketball. These two decades bring all major achievements in our club’s history. The upward trend begins with the arrival of Simeon Varchev (at that time young and ambitious trainer), who bring with him Georgi Glushkov, a young and promising player. With the financial aid of the Chemical Plants in Devnya, basketball becomes sport number one in Varna. In 1985 we win our first Championship in Sofia, beating all of our major opponents in the direct games.. This happens two more times – in 1998 we beat Slavia 3-1 in the final playoff (with decisive win in Sofia) and one year later, surely the happiest moment for the fans, was our last title in 1999. Then we beat Levski 3-2 games, as the decisive match was in the fully crowded and ecstatic “Kongresna” hall in Varna. “Cherno more” also wins three Bulgarian Cups in a row – 1998 in Burgas, 1999 in Botevgrad, and 2000 in Plovdiv. During this period the team is constant in the first six of first basketball division and takes part in nine final playoffs. Since 1991 the club is entitled “Cherno more”. Apart from winning titles and national cups, during this period the team plays some great European games. „The Seamen” beat “Tuborg” – Izmir, ”Sporting” – Athens, ”Spartak” – Subotica, ”Banco di Roma”, ”Jeleznik”, ”Avtodor” – Saratov, ”Charleroi”, ”Honka”, etc. In The Palace of Culture and Sports we host also “АЕК” – Athens (“Saporta cup” winners for 2000), ”Zadar” (semifinalists in the same tournament) and many other classy European teams. 1985 is significant in Bulgarian basketball history. Our best player Georgi Glushkov becomes the first eastern European player to sign an NBA team  - he played for “Phoenix Suns”. Glushkov gets another award, as he is voted part of the all European cup team  in West Germany in 1985. At this period our team is full of stars like Hristo Borisov, Todor Stoykov, Spas Natov, Jurij Shishkov, Bojcho Branzov, Dimo Kostov, Denislav Kotzev, Ivan Borisov and Boris Borisov, Georgi Kovachev, Stoyan Monov, Aleksi Aleksiev, Mihail Manolov, Valentin Stoev, Margarit Kayriakov, Tsvetan Nedelchev, Boris Stoyanov, Ivan Drumev, Kalin Velchev, Emil Boyadjijski, Eduard Valchev, Leven Belberov. The foreigners Keith Hughes, Vahtang Natsvishvili and Igor Miglenieks, all these will always be in the Varna fans’ hearts.  

During this period the team is led by the duo Simeon Varchev – Hristo Borisov, assisted by some of the best specialists in Bulgaria – Petko Delev, Darin Velikov, and many others.  
 
The period after 2001 is not as glorious as the Varna’s audience would expect.   People got used to great victories and cannot accept the runner-up role of the club, after the financial giants from Lukoil Academik. Some of the best Cherno more players like Boris Stoyanov, Leven Belberov, Julian Radionov, Asen Velikov and of course Todor Stoykov were attracted by Lukoil, and helped them win almost every possible trophy.

During this period after 2001 Cherno more took part in four National Cup Finals (Pleven’01, Sevlievo’03, Russe’06 and Samokov’08) – all of them lost, and one National Championship Finals in 2006.  
 
The club continues creating great young basketball players, who are among the leaders in many competitions for the different age groups. Unfortunately most of them like Kaloyan Ivanov, Deyan Ivanov, Bojidar Avramov and many others leave the club as teenagers. The reasons for this are the financial problems of the club (during the last period the club was saved from bankruptcy twice) and also the intention of the managers of the club not to stop the progress of their youngsters. The main victims of this policy are the fans, but they continue to support their favorite club.

External links 
 Eurobasket.com BC Cherno More PV Page
 https://nbl.basketball.bg/team.php?id=1319 Current squad] (in Bulgarian)

Basketball teams in Bulgaria
Sport in Varna, Bulgaria